Mesorhizobium tarimense is a gram-negative, aerobic, non-spore-forming bacteria from the genus Mesorhizobium which was isolated from wild growing legumes which were collected from soils of Xinjiang in China.

References

External links
Type strain of Mesorhizobium tarimense at BacDive -  the Bacterial Diversity Metadatabase

Phyllobacteriaceae
Bacteria described in 2008